Calliandra parviflora is a species of flowering plants of the genus Calliandra in the family Fabaceae. The original description states that the flowers have purple stamens.

References

parviflora
Taxa named by George Bentham